WRUS (610 AM) is a radio station licensed to serve the community of Russellville, Kentucky. WRUS is owned by Logan Radio Inc. WRUS operates with a daytime power of 1800 watts and 59 watts at night per FCC authorization.

610 AM is a Regional broadcast frequency.

History
WRUS began broadcasting on August 28, 1953. The station originally broadcast at 800 kilohertz, but in 1957 its frequency was changed to 610 kHz where it still operates today.

FM translator
WRUS also broadcasts on an FM translator in order to provide improved sound and better nighttime coverage.

Programming
The station features morning show host Don Neagle, a member of the Kentucky Journalism Hall of Fame. Don began his career at WRUS on September 1, 1958. Midday host is Chris McGinnis. Afternoon host is currently Myla Porter. 

WRUS airs a full service format with news, classic country, and oldies music throughout the day. WRUS also broadcasts many of the football and basketball games of Russellville High School and Logan County High School.

References

External links

RUS
Radio stations established in 1953
1953 establishments in Kentucky
Classic country radio stations in the United States
Oldies radio stations in the United States
News and talk radio stations in the United States
Russellville, Kentucky